Tauras is a Lithuanian masculine given name. Individuals with the name Tauras include:
Tauras Jogėla (born 1993), Lithuanian basketball player
Tauras Stumbrys (1970–2004), Lithuanian basketball player
Tauras Tunyla (born 1993), Lithuanian racing driver

Lithuanian masculine given names